Clarence Shenton (1901 – 1934) was an Australian soccer player who played as a half-back for Brisbane clubs Wynnum and Thistle as well as the Australia national soccer team.

Early life
Clarence William Britton Shenton was born in Nambour, Queensland. He went to Ipswich Grammar School, which proved himself as a professional sportsman. He played in Bundamba, after leaving school where he played a season of rugby and Australian rules football.

International career
Shenton was a member of inaugural Australian soccer team, which toured New Zealand in 1922. He played all three 'A' international matches against the New Zealand national team and has since been designated as 'Socceroo #9'.

Personal life
After his short soccer career, he moved to playing tennis as his sport of choice. He became President of Ipswich Tennis Association around where he died in 1934.

Family and relationships
Clarence Shenton was married on 14 April 1928 to wife Ivy Walker.

Death
Shenton died on 13 December 1934 at age 33, after suffering from a grave illness for five months.

Career statistics

International

References

Australian soccer players
Association football midfielders
Australia international soccer players
1901 births
1934 deaths
People from Nambour, Queensland